Cédric Sacras, (Born 28 September 1996) is a Luxembourger international footballer who plays as a defender for Swift Hesperange in the Luxembourg National Division, as well as the Luxembourg national football team.

Career

Cédric Sacras began his career as a footballer at the club Swift Hesperange in Luxembourg. He excelled in the youth group of the club, where he was noticed and then supervised by Ligue 1 side FC Metz. He finally signed a youth contract with FC Metz in 2011. From 2013 until the beginning of the 2016/17 season, he played for the reserve team at FC Metz who then played in the CFA and later the CFA 2. He played both in the position of left back and central defender.

However at the beginning of the 2016/17 season, he was unable to sign a full professional contract with FC Metz to join the first team, so instead signed for CS Fola Esch.

International career

Cédric Sacras has played in two games for Luxembourg.

He made his debut on 29 March 2016 against Albania in a 2-0 loss as an 86th-minute substitute for Ricardo Delgado at the Stade Josy Barthel. He played in his second game against Nigeria in a 3-1 loss, also as a substitute.

References

1996 births
Living people
Luxembourgian footballers
Luxembourg international footballers
Association football defenders